Give Us This Day is a 1943 Australian propaganda documentary short film about food rationing from Ken G. Hall.

References

External links

Give Us This Day at Australian Screen Online

Australian World War II propaganda films